Thomas Townshend may refer to:

Thomas Townshend (MP) (1701–1780), British MP
Thomas Townshend, 1st Viscount Sydney (1733–1800), British politician, son of the above

See also
 Thomas Townsend (disambiguation)